The Concentration was a coalition of Dutch liberal parties between 1901 and 1918. The Vrijzinnig Democratische Bond, Liberale Unie and the Bond Vrije Liberalen participated. The main issue which united these parties was universal suffrage and their opposition to equal financing for religious schools. The Concentration governed between 1905 and 1908, led by the Theo de Meester with support of the social-democratic SDAP and 1913 and 1918 led by Pieter Cort van der Linden in an extra-parliamentary cabinet. In 1921 two of the component parties, the League of Free Liberals and the Liberal Union form the Liberal State Party, the Freedom League.

1901 establishments in the Netherlands
1918 disestablishments in the Netherlands
Political history of the Netherlands